The following are the national records in Olympic weightlifting in Venezuela. Records are maintained in each weight class for the snatch lift, clean and jerk lift, and the total for both lifts by the Federacion Venezolana de Levant. de Pesas.

Current records

Men

Women

Historical records

Men (1998–2018)

Women (1998–2018)

References

External links

Venezuela
Venezuela
Weightlifting
Olympic weightlifting